Peter Michael Davidson (born November 16, 1993) is an American comedian, actor, writer, rapper, and singer. Davidson was a cast member on the NBC late-night sketch comedy series Saturday Night Live for eight seasons, joining the show for its 40th season in 2014, and leaving at the end of its 47th season in 2022. 

Davidson's father, Scott Matthew Davidson, was a New York firefighter who died in 2001 at the World Trade Center during the September 11 attacks. Davidson began his career in the early 2010s with minor guest roles on Brooklyn Nine-Nine, Friends of the People, Guy Code, and Wild 'n Out. He released his comedy specials Pete Davidson: SMD (2016) and Pete Davidson: Alive from New York (2020). 

Davidson starred and executive produced the comedy film Big Time Adolescence (2019), and co-wrote and starred in the semi-autobiographical comedy-drama film The King of Staten Island (2020). Davidson continued acting in films such as The Suicide Squad (2021), Bodies Bodies Bodies (2022), Meet Cute (2022), and Marmaduke (2022).

Early life
Peter Michael Davidson was born in New York City's Staten Island borough on November 16, 1993, the son of Amy (née Waters) and Scott Matthew Davidson. His father was a New York City firefighter for Ladder 118 who died in service during the September 11, 2001 attacks, along with the rest of his unit. He was last seen running up the stairs of the Marriott World Trade Center just before the building was destroyed when the Twin Towers collapsed. His Requiem Mass was held at St. Clare's Catholic Church in Great Kills, Staten Island. Davidson, then aged seven, was profoundly affected by the loss. He told The New York Times that it was "overwhelming" and that he later acted out in school as a result of the trauma, at one point ripping his hair out until he was bald. In October 2016, he revealed on The Breakfast Club morning radio show that he struggled with suicidal thoughts when he was younger and that the music of Kid Cudi saved his life.

Davidson's father was predominantly of Jewish ancestry, with some distant German, Irish, and Italian roots. His mother is of mostly Irish ancestry, with some distant German roots. He has a younger sister named Casey and was raised Catholic. Davidson attended St. Joseph by-the-Sea High School, then Tottenville High School before transferring to Brooklyn's Xaverian High School and graduating from there in 2011. After high school, he enrolled at St. Francis College in Brooklyn Heights. After one semester, Davidson decided to pursue a career in comedy full-time. He first tried stand-up comedy at age sixteen in a Staten Island bowling alley, where a group of friends that included professional baseball player Matthew Festa, knowing of his comedy aspirations, dared him to take to the stage.

Career

Early career
Davidson's earliest onscreen appearance was in the third episode of the MTV comedy series Failosophy, which premiered February 28, 2013. The following month, he appeared in "PDA and Moms," a third-season episode of the MTV2 reality TV comedy series Guy Code, the first of four episodes in which he was featured. That June, his first televised standup aired as part of a second-season episode of the Comedy Central program Gotham Comedy Live, which showcases standup comedians at the Gotham Comedy Club in New York City. The following month, he returned to MTV2 with an appearance on Nick Cannon Presents: Wild 'N Out, his first of six appearances on that show. He subsequently made standup appearances on television and appeared in Brooklyn Nine-Nine. In 2014, he acquired a role in a Fox comedy pilot, Sober Companion, but it ultimately did not make it to series.

Saturday Night Live and other work (2014–2022) 
Davidson joined the cast of Saturday Night Live with the show's 40th-season premiere, which debuted on September 27, 2014. At age 20, he was the first SNL cast member to be born in the 1990s and one of the youngest cast members ever. The first new addition to the cast that season, Davidson was given a chance to audition for the show through regular Bill Hader, whom he had met while filming a small part in the 2015 Judd Apatow feature film comedy Trainwreck. Hader subsequently told producer Lorne Michaels about him. His debut garnered positive critical notice, with his most noted skits during the season including an Indiana Jones-style sketch in which he and Dwayne "The Rock" Johnson, after being pelted with poison darts, were forced to mutually suck poison out of each other's various body parts, an endeavor that eventually found them entangled in the "69" position. Another involved Davidson being shot in the chest with an arrow by Norman Reedus.

In March 2015, Davidson was a roaster on the Comedy Central Roast of Justin Bieber, and his set was praised as one of the best of the show. Among his bolder jokes was one at the expenses of fellow roaster Snoop Dogg, host Kevin Hart, and their 2004 film Soul Plane. Davidson, whose firefighter father died responding to the September 11 attacks, called the film "the worst experience of [his] life involving a plane". In 2016, he was placed on the Forbes 30 under 30 list. In April of that year, Comedy Central filmed Davidson's first stand-up special, Pete Davidson: SMD, in New York City.

In January 2019, it was announced that Davidson would be touring with John Mulaney in New York, New Jersey, Pennsylvania, and Massachusetts for a limited series of comedy shows titled "Sundays with Pete & John." Mulaney and Davidson have become close appearing together on The Tonight Show Starring Jimmy Fallon and Saturday Night Live. That May, after the 44th-season finale of SNL, Travis M. Andrews of The Washington Post credited Davidson with being the most memorable performer that season and its breakout star, which Andrews attributed to Davidson's mining of his personal struggles and his admission of his comedic missteps, which Andrews felt gave the season a mixture of comedy and pathos.

Davidson collaborated with Machine Gun Kelly to write the sketch "A Message from the Count" for Kelly's album Hotel Diablo. In 2019 he starred in Jason Orley's Big Time Adolescence, and had supporting roles in Adam Shankman's What Men Want, Jeff Tremaine's The Dirt, Thurop Van Orman's The Angry Birds Movie 2, and John Turturro's The Big Lebowski spin-off The Jesus Rolls. In February 2020, Davidson released his stand up special Alive from New York on Netflix. In May 2020, The King of Staten Island was released, which Davidson both starred in and co-wrote with Judd Apatow, who also directed. Davidson was nominated for The Comedy Movie Star of 2020 for his work in The King of Staten Island and The Comedy Act of 2020 Pete Davidson: Alive from New York at the 46th People's Choice Awards. In April 2021, Davidson was cast as Joey Ramone in a Netflix biopic I Slept With Joey Ramone, based on the late singer's brother's memoir of the same name. Davidson will also serve as co-writer and executive producer. In August 2021, he appeared as Blackguard in The Suicide Squad directed by James Gunn. He voiced Marmaduke in an animated film released on Netflix on May 6, 2022. Following lengthy absences in season 47, it was announced shortly before its finale that it would be Davidson's last on Saturday Night Live.

Comedy style

Davidson has been praised for basing his comedy on his own life and employing aspects of his life that have been likened to "a series of brutal truths and vulgar confessions" which make him relatable to audiences. He touches upon topics such as marijuana, sex, and relationships. He talks about incidents from his awkward high school experiences to living in a dormitory during his brief stint at St. Francis College. He jokes about highly sensitive subjects, including the loss of his father during the September 11 attacks. He says he finds that it empowers him to address the feeling of powerlessness that experiencing such tragedy at a young age inflicted upon him. He is a fan of the Harry Potter franchise and has incorporated that material into his comedy work as well.

Personal life
In October 2015, Davidson lived in Brooklyn Heights, New York. In 2019, he lived in Staten Island with his mother in a home they purchased together. In April 2021, he moved into his own residence in Staten Island. In February 2022, Davidson announced plans to move from Staten Island to Brooklyn. Davidson is godfather of Leo, the son of fellow comedian and friend Ricky Velez. He is close friends with Seattle Mariners pitcher Matthew Festa, where they were classmates together at St. Joseph by the Sea High School.

By August 2018, Davidson had over 40 tattoos, including on his arms, legs, chest, hands, and neck. Davidson has his father's firefighter badge number, 8418, tattooed on his left arm. During a May 2021 interview, he indicated that he was having some of them removed.

Davidson supported Hillary Clinton in the 2016 U.S. presidential election, and on December 5, 2017, he stated on his Instagram account that he got a tattoo on his leg of Clinton, whom he called his "hero", a "badass", and "one of the strongest people in the universe". Clinton herself thanked Davidson for the compliment, joking: "This makes it significantly less awkward that I've had a Pete Davidson tattoo for years." He supported Joe Biden in the 2020 U.S. presidential election.

In January 2022, Davidson and fellow SNL colleague Colin Jost bought a decommissioned Staten Island ferry with plans to convert it into a comedy club.

Health
Davidson was diagnosed with Crohn's disease at age 17 or 18, for which he receives intravenous biologic therapy, and uses medical marijuana for pain management and recreationally. On March 6, 2017, Davidson announced on his Instagram account that he had quit drugs and was sober for the first time in eight years. During an interview on comedian Marc Maron's podcast, Davidson clarified that the only drug he used was marijuana and, while he has since cut back on its use considerably, the personal and emotional problems he initially assumed were the result of his daily marijuana use were actually caused by his newly diagnosed borderline personality disorder, for which he has since been undergoing treatment.

On December 3, 2018, Davidson shared a candid Instagram post in which he expressed thoughts of suicide, before deleting his account on the social media platform entirely. The New York Police Department conducted a wellness check on Davidson in response to social media posts from followers and former fiancée Ariana Grande. Davidson had been at the Saturday Night Live studio at the time preparing for the last episode of the year before its holiday hiatus. Davidson and John Mulaney, comedian and former SNL writer, made humorous references to the Instagram post during the Weekend Update segment of the first episode following the holiday hiatus on January 19, 2019.

Relationships
Davidson has been in several relationships with high profile entertainers and his dating life is often written about by entertainment journalists.

Davidson dated comedian Carly Aquilino from 2014 until 2015, and dated Cazzie David, daughter of comedian Larry David, from 2016 to 2018. 

In May 2018, he started dating singer Ariana Grande. In June 2018, Davidson confirmed he was engaged to Grande, but the engagement was called off in October 2018. Grande's song about Davidson, titled "Pete Davidson", appears on her 2018 album Sweetener. She also referenced him in her song "Thank U, Next" with the lyric, "Even almost got married/ And for Pete I'm so thankful".

In January 2019, Davidson was reported to be in a relationship with actress Kate Beckinsale, twenty years his senior, but by April they had "called time on their romance". In response to media comments about the age difference, he said that such an age gap was new to him and that the media should ask older men in longer relationships with younger women such as Leonardo DiCaprio, Alec Baldwin, Larry King, and Donald Trump about it.

He also dated actress Margaret Qualley, daughter of Andie MacDowell until their relationship ended in October 2019. He was involved with model Kaia Gerber from October 2019 to January 2020. In August 2021, he split from Bridgerton actress Phoebe Dynevor, daughter of actress Sally Dynevor, after a five-month relationship.

Davidson and Kim Kardashian were first spotted out together in October 2021 following Kardashian's appearance on Saturday Night Live. During her time hosting an episode of SNL, the two shared an on-screen kiss in a Disney-themed sketch, where they played Jasmine and Aladdin. They began dating in November 2021. Previously, Kardashian filed for divorce from husband Kanye West in February 2021. Following a very public split, Kardashian was legally declared single by a judge in March 2022. West referenced the relationship in his 2022 track "Eazy", in which he threatens to "beat Pete Davidson's ass". The music video for Eazy depicted a claymation figure of Davidson being kidnapped, buried, and showed his decapitated head. West further attacked Davidson on Instagram in February of the same year, calling him a "dickhead" and "Hillary Clinton's ex boyfriend". In August 2022, Davidson and Kardashian split up after nine months of dating.

Stalking incident 
In March 2021, a woman falsely claimed to be married to Davidson and misrepresented his association with a business of hers. The woman was reported to have illegally entered his home and subsequently faced legal charges.

Space flight 
In March 2022, spaceflight company Blue Origin announced that Davidson would be an "honorary guest" alongside five paying customers onboard NS-20, a suborbital flight of its New Shepard craft planned for later that month. However, the flight was rescheduled, and Blue Origin announced that Davidson was "no longer able" to join the crew of the craft.

Controversies

Catholic Church
The Roman Catholic Diocese of Brooklyn demanded an apology from Davidson in March 2019, after an SNL sketch where he compared the Catholic Church to R. Kelly, an entertainer who had been accused of pedophilia. In the sketch, Davidson said, "[Kelly] is a monster and he should go to jail forever. But if you support the Catholic Church, isn't that like the same thing as being an R. Kelly fan? I don't really see the difference, except for one's music is significantly better." In a statement posted on its website, the diocese criticized the "disgraceful and offensive skit" and added, "The faithful of our Church are disgusted by the harassment by those in news and entertainment, and this sketch offends millions. The mockery of this difficult time in the Church's history serves no purpose." Davidson's comments came after the Diocese of Brooklyn and Queens agreed to a record $27.5 million settlement for sex abuse allegations in September 2018.

Dan Crenshaw
Davidson was heavily criticized for mocking Republican congressional candidate Dan Crenshaw, who wears an eye patch as a result of a wound incurred while serving as a U.S. Navy SEAL in Afghanistan. Davidson compared Crenshaw to "a hitman in a porno movie" and added, "I'm sorry, I know he lost his eye in war or whatever."

In response to public outrage over the comments, Crenshaw appeared beside Davidson the following Saturday on an SNL Weekend Update segment. Davidson apologized to Crenshaw, stating, "I mean this from the bottom of my heart: it was a poor choice of words... the man is a war hero, and he deserves all the respect in the world." Crenshaw accepted Davidson's apology and called on Americans to "never forget" the service and sacrifices of veterans. Crenshaw also paid tribute to Davidson's father, a firefighter who had been killed during the September 11 attacks. Crenshaw and others have speculated that the joke and the subsequent attention may have helped him win Texas's 2nd congressional district in the 2018 midterm election.

In his 2020 Netflix special Alive from New York, Davidson rescinded the apology previously issued to Crenshaw, implying that it had been issued only because he had been told to do so. In the performance, Davidson tells the audience, "I didn't think I did anything wrong. It was like words that were twisted so that a guy could be famous. So I made fun of this guy with an eye patch, and then, like, I kind of got forced to apologize." Crenshaw responded by stating that, although he had initially hoped that Davidson's apology had been sincere, "you can never tell with comedians" and added, "To be fair, if we took everything that comedians said on a Netflix special seriously, man, our country would be in a world of hurt. I would like to remember the guy that I saw in person and hung out with that night (on SNL)."

When he left SNL in May 2022, Davidson commented that "A lot has changed. In three years, Fox News went from calling me a monster for making fun of Congressman Dan Crenshaw's eye patch to also making fun of Dan Crenshaw's eye patch." He was referring to Fox News' Tucker Carlson calling Crenshaw "Eyepatch McCain."

Accolades

Filmography

Film

Television

Discography

See also
 List of people diagnosed with Crohn's disease

References

External links

 
 Pete Davidson saying farewell to SNL, video on Twitter

1993 births
21st-century American comedians
21st-century American male actors
American impressionists (entertainers)
American male comedians
American male film actors
American male television actors
American people of Irish descent
American people of Jewish descent
American sketch comedians
American stand-up comedians
Comedians from New York (state)
Living people
Male actors from New York (state)
People from Staten Island
People with Crohn's disease
People with borderline personality disorder